Atli Þór Héðinsson (born 23 September 1953) is an Icelandic former footballer who played as a forward. He won two caps for the Iceland national football team in 1974.

Atli made his international debut in the 2–2 draw with Finland on 19 August 1974. He played his second and final match for Iceland almost two months later, in the 1–1 draw away at East Germany.

References

Atli Þór Héðinsson international appearances at ksi.is

1953 births
Living people
Atli Thor Hedinsson
Association football forwards
Atli Thor Hedinsson
Greenock Morton F.C. players
Atli Thor Hedinsson
Atli Thor Hedinsson
Icelandic expatriate footballers
Expatriate men's footballers in Denmark
Icelandic expatriate sportspeople in Denmark
Expatriate footballers in Scotland
Icelandic expatriate sportspeople in Scotland